Crockatt is a surname. Notable people with the surname include:

Ian Crockatt (born 1949), Scottish poet and translator
Joan Crockatt (born 1955), Canadian politician

See also
 Crockett (surname)